Uptown Virginia is an indoor shopping center in Virginia, Minnesota.

History
The mall was constructed in 1971 by Gamble Development Co. as Thunderbird Mall. Among its tenants were JCPenney, Kmart, and a Jerry Lewis Cinema theater.(10 August 2011). Bygones for Aug 10, Duluth News Tribune (excerpt from August 10, 1971 issue)   Herberger's moved its Virginia location from downtown into the mall in 1977, and closed in 2018.  The K-Mart closed in 2016.

RockstepCapital (headquartered in Houston, Texas) acquired the mall from Rubloff Development Group of Rockford, Illinois in 2014Ott, Kevin (11 March 2018). Virginia's Thunderbird Mall adjusting to changes in industry, Duluth News Tribune

It was renamed "Uptown Virginia" in July 2020.Taylor, Nachai (25 July 2020). Thunderbird Mall In Virginia Gets A Name Change, Fox 21

Location
The mall is located on the north side of the U.S. Highway 53. The mall contains around 30 retail tenants.(17 October 2016). Thunderbird Mall in Virginia will be 'de-malled', Duluth News-Tribune

References 

Shopping malls established in 1971
Shopping malls in Minnesota